Swami Sureshanand (1952-2020) was an Indian politician. He was elected to the Lok Sabha, the lower house of the Parliament of India from the Jalesar, Uttar Pradesh constituency of Uttar Pradesh as a member of the Bharatiya Janata Party. He died on 8 May 2020.

References

External links
 Official Biographical Sketch in Lok Sabha Website

India MPs 1998–1999
Lok Sabha members from Uttar Pradesh
Bharatiya Janata Party politicians from Uttar Pradesh
1952 births
2020 deaths